Hub E City is a cable television StarHub TV channel 825 which belongs to StarHub. Its programming consists solely of drama series and hot entertainment programmes from Taiwan, Japan and Korea, dubbed into Mandarin for dramas (variety shows remain Korean) and also airs highly rated Taiwanese variety shows presented by popular hosts. There are commercial breaks during programmes on every 30 minutes. Starhub CableTV's channel 826 is E City +2 channel, showing programmes they air 2 hours before at a 2-hour later timeslot, which is still under the Chinese Entertainment Basic Group together with its Start Over and Catch Up TV buttons. Now Starhub also has added Starhub CableTV's channel 111, a simulcast of E City channel 825. Initially both of them are complimentary only on for one and a half years from 25 April 2011 to 31 December 2012, however, the complimentary viewing extended for two more years, which ends on 31 December 2014

The channel is a Homemade Theme channel by StarHub TV, along with HUB VV Drama (including On Demand), HUB Sports (4 different numbered channels, as well as HUB Sports Arena), HUB Sensasi, HUB Dunia Sinema On Demand, HUB Ru Yi Hokkien On Demand and HUB Varnam VOD.

In February 2012, for a period of 7 weeks, E City was the broadcaster of the Mandarin version of Fairprice Family Cook Off (S2). The English version was broadcast by the Asian Food Channel (Ch 435).

In July 2012, for a period of 10 weeks, E City broadcast Sunsilk Academy Fantasia, the first reality singing competition in Singaporean after two and a half years. Subscribers could view the contestants' status every night, including the delayed broadcast of the weekly rounds. Subscribers could also watch the contestants' status live on the now defunct Academy Fantasia Channel (Ch 110).

TV shows from April 2011
These are the shows that have been broadcast on E City since April 2011, according to the colours of the logo, blue, orange, green and purple respectively. Variety specials are not included in this list.

Current categories

7pm dramas 戏剧7点档
2nd session: Mondays to Fridays, 5.00pm - 6.00pm: (encored at 10.30am - 11.30am)
Father and Son 父与子
1st session: Mondays to Fridays, 7pm - 8.00pm: (encored at 9.00am - 10.00am)
Golden Fish 禁忌的爱恋 황금물고기
Inborn Pair 真爱找麻烦
Love and Obession 蔷花与红莲 장화홍련
Smile Again 笑吧！东海 웃어라 동해야
Former teen 10pm drama timeslot: Mondays to Fridays, 10.00pm - 11.00pm (encored at 3.30am - 4.30am, 1.30pm - 2.30pm and Saturdays, 8.00am - 12.30pm)
Waking Love Up 爱情睡醒了

Teens 四角酷
Mondays to Fridays, 11.00pm - 12.30am:

Manga: second telecast: Tuesdays to Saturdays, 7.30am - 8.00am and Sundays, 8.00am - 10.30am
Bakuman 爆漫王 バクマン。
Giant Killing 逆转监督
One Piece 海贼王
Katekyo Hitman Reborn 4 家庭教师4 家庭教師ヒットマンREBORN! 4
Yakitate!! Japan 烘焙王 焼きたて!! ジャぱん

Entertainment:
Showbiz 完全娱乐

Former JK drama timeslot: Saturdays, 11.00pm - 1.15am; second telecasts on Sundays, 4.00am - 6.30am and at 5.00pm - 7.15pm
Athena: Goddess of War 雅典娜：戰爭女神 아테나: 전쟁의 여신

Kids 小绿豆
Sundays, 10.30am - 12.30pm
Brainy Bubbly Bug Buddies 小虫虫有大智慧
Dr. Arty Farty 画神闲
Follow Me 下课花路米
Fruity Pie 水果冰淇淋
Patch Pillows 宝宝枕丁
XTY Fun Tuition 阳光小学堂

Taiwan idol dramas 都会偶像剧
Saturdays, 8.00pm - 9.30pm; second telecasts on Sundays, 6.30am - 8.00am and at Saturdays, 2.30pm - 4.00pm
In Time with You 我可能不会爱你
Love Forward 向前走向爱走
Office Girls 小资女孩向前冲
They Are Flying 飞行少年

Weekday entertainment 娱乐8点档
Mondays to Fridays, 8.00pm - 10.00pm
All Pass 百万小学堂
Diamond Club 钻石夜总会
Majesty Gourmet 至尊美食王
Mr. J Channel Mr. J频道
Power Sunday POWER星期天
SS Swallow Night SS小燕之夜
Super Idol 超级偶像
Variety Big Brother 综艺大哥大

Weekend entertainment 周末好康
Saturdays 7.00pm - 8.00pm
The Classics of Kang Xi 康熙精选 / 奇怪10点档：康熙来了 / 康熙来了
Miss Traveller WOMAN爱旅行

Saturdays 9.30pm - 10.30pm / 11.00pm
Harlem Music 给你哈音乐
SS Swallow Night SS小燕之夜

Sundays 7.00pm - 8.00pm
Bringing Up Parents 爸媽囧很大

Sundays from 11.30pm - 12.30am
2NE1 TV
Hello Baby Girls Generation
Hello Baby ShinEE
Hello Baby T-ARA
Special D-Day

Every night at 12.30am
TVB Entertainment News 无线娱乐新闻

Former categories

Teens 四角酷
10pm dramas:
Channel X 国民英雄
Desperately Loving You 爱在桐花纷飞时
Hayate the Combat Butler 旋風管家
Love Recipe 料理情人梦
Love Together 爱让我们在一起
Pearls of Love 第一百万颗珍珠
Rogue Principal 铁汉校长
Tamra, the Island 垂涎之島 탐나는도다
That Love Comes 欢迎爱光临
Tokyo Dogs 东京DOGS
Who's The One 我的完美男人

Taiwan idol dramas 都会偶像剧
Sunday timeslot:
The Shrewd Wife 犀利人妻
While We Were Drunk 醉后决定爱上你

JK dramas JK剧场
Dream High 梦想高飞 드림하이
In Need of Romance 需要浪漫 로맨스가 필요해
Mary is Out At Night 玛丽外宿中 매리는 외박중
Moon Lovers 月之恋人 月の恋人
Naughty Kiss 恶作剧之吻 장난스런
Secret Garden 秘密花园 시크릿 가든

Weekend entertainment 周末好康
Former 9.30pm - 11.30pm timeslot
Matilda's Talkshow 陶子藝言堂

都会LIVE!星期天
Sundays, 8.00pm - 10.00pm (simulcast with Taiwan CTV)
Million Star 華人星光大道
Million Star Reunion 華人星光大道回顾特辑 (决战星时代)
Mimic King 超级模王大道

Sundays, 10.00pm - 11.30pm (broadcast with Taiwan FTV)
Skip Beat! 華丽的挑战

See also
StarHub TV
VV Drama
Sensasi
List of E City programmes in 2013

References

External links
 Starhub CableTV programme guide

2009 establishments in Singapore
Television stations in Singapore
Television channels and stations established in 2009